The 2015 African Women's Handball Champions League was the 37th edition, organized by the African Handball Confederation, under the auspices of the International Handball Federation, the handball sport governing body. The tournament was held from October 21–30, 2015 in three venues: Salle Al Aroui, Salle Omnisport and Salle Sellaouan, in Nador, Morocco, contested by 10 teams and won by Clube Desportivo Primeiro de Agosto of Angola.

Draw

Preliminary round

Times given below are in WET UTC+0.

Group A

* Note:  Advance to quarter-finals Relegated to 9th place classification

Group B

* Note:  Advance to quarter-finals Relegated to 9th place classification

Knockout stage
Championship bracket

5-8th bracket

9th place

Final ranking

See also
 2015 African Women's Handball Cup Winners' Cup
 2014 African Women's Handball Championship

References

External links
 Official website

Africa Women's Handball Championship for Clubs Champions
Women's Handball Championship for Clubs Champions
African Women's Handball Champions League
International handball competitions hosted by Morocco